Javornik is a small dispersed settlement on the slopes of Javornik Hill south of Črni Vrh in the Municipality of Idrija in the traditional Inner Carniola region of Slovenia. Its remoteness and high elevation have resulted in people moving away from their farms, and there is only a single resident in the settlement.

References

External links 
Javornik on Geopedia

Populated places in the Municipality of Idrija